Waverley Bus Depot is a bus depot in the Sydney suburb of Bondi Junction operated by Transdev John Holland.

History
Waverley Tram Depot opened on 7 September 1902 as a seventeen road depot on the corner of Oxford Street and York Road, Bondi Junction. It provided trams that operated the Bondi and Bronte routes.

The depot closed on 27 June 1959 for conversion a to bus depot. Today only the southern section of the car shed remains, the northern section having been demolished. 

As part of the contracting out of Sydney Bus Region 9, operation of Waverley depot passed from State Transit to Transdev John Holland on 2 April 2022.

As of November 2022, it has an allocation of 164 buses.

Design
The side elevations looking west to Centennial Park were designed with stepped Dutch gables with circular ventilation openings. Including:

17 tracks
brick gabled parapet
brick stepped style gables, with circular vents
Roof orientation to south

Gallery

References

External links

Service NSW

Bus garages
Industrial buildings in Sydney
Tram depots in Sydney
Transport infrastructure completed in 1902